Epilysta is a genus of beetles in the family Cerambycidae, containing the following species:

 Epilysta flavescens Breuning & de Jong, 1941
 Epilysta mucida Pascoe, 1865

References

Apomecynini
Cerambycidae genera